Vesmaq (also Romanized as Vasmaq; also known as Vīsmāch) is a village in Alvir Rural District, Kharqan District, Zarandieh County, Markazi Province, Iran. At the 2006 census, its population was 292, in 123 families.

References 

Populated places in Zarandieh County